The 1978–79 NCAA Division I men's basketball season began in November 1978, progressed through the regular season and conference tournaments, and concluded with the 1979 NCAA Division I men's basketball tournament championship game on March 26, 1979, at the Special Events Center in Salt Lake City, Utah. The Michigan State Spartans won their first NCAA national championship with a 75–64 victory over the Indiana State Sycamores.

Season headlines 

 Indiana State senior forward Larry Bird and Michigan Spartans sophomore point guard Earvin "Magic" Johnson emerged as two highly popular and successful players during the season, and their rivalry — culminating in a meeting in the national championship game — captured national attention of basketball fans and the sports media during the year.
 In the Pacific 10 Conference, UCLA won an NCAA-record 13th consecutive conference title.
 The first Great Alaska Shootout took place. The long-running Shootout would become one of the premier early-season tournaments before it was discontinued after its 2017 edition.
 On February 24, North Carolina trailed Duke 7–0 at halftime. It was the first scoreless half for an NCAA basketball team since 1938.
 At Boston College, players took part in a point-shaving scheme which was revealed in 1980.
 The NCAA tournament expanded from 32 to 40 teams and used seeding for the first time, and the championship game enjoyed the highest television rating in college basketball history.
 The National Invitation Tournament expanded from 16 to 24 teams.
 The growing fan appreciation and financial success of college basketball during the season prompted planning for the creation of the ESPN network and the original Big East Conference, both of which launched the following season and would push the sport to greater prominence in the years to come.

Season outlook

Pre-season polls 

The top 20 from the AP Poll during the pre-season.

Conference membership changes 

The 1978–79 season was most notable for the expansion of the Pacific-8 Conference to 10 members with the addition of the men's athletic programs of Arizona and Arizona State (the conference did not sponsor women's sports until the 1986–87 school year). The conference duly renamed itself the Pacific-10 Conference.

Regular season

Conference winners and tournaments 

Of 22 Division I basketball conferences, 13 determined their league champion with a single-elimination tournament, while seven leagues sent their regular-season champion to the NCAA Tournament. The Southwestern Athletic Conference (SWAC) did not receive an automatic tournament bid until the 1979–80 season, while the Trans America Athletic Conference (TAAC) received their automatic bid in 1980–81.

From 1975 to 1982, the Eastern College Athletic Conference (ECAC), a loosely organized sports federation of Northeastern colleges and universities, organized Division I ECAC regional tournaments for those of its members that were independents in basketball. Each 1979 tournament winner received an automatic bid to the 1979 NCAA Division I men's basketball tournament in the same way that the tournament champions of conventional athletic conferences did.

Informal championships

Statistical leaders

Post-season tournaments

NCAA tournament

Final Four 

Third Place – DePaul 96, Penn 93 (OT)

National Invitation tournament

Semifinals & finals 

 Third Place – Alabama 96, Ohio State 86

Awards

Consensus All-American teams

Major player of the year awards 

 Wooden Award: Larry Bird, Indiana State
 Naismith Award: Larry Bird, Indiana State
 Helms Player of the Year:  Larry Bird, Indiana State
 Associated Press Player of the Year: Larry Bird, Indiana State
 UPI Player of the Year: Larry Bird, Indiana State
 NABC Player of the Year: Larry Bird, Indiana State
 Oscar Robertson Trophy (USBWA): Larry Bird, Indiana State
 Adolph Rupp Trophy: Larry Bird, Indiana State
 Sporting News Player of the Year: Larry Bird, Indiana State

Major coach of the year awards 

 Associated Press Coach of the Year: Bill Hodges, Indiana State
 Henry Iba Award (USBWA): Dean Smith, North Carolina
 NABC Coach of the Year: Ray Meyer, DePaul
 UPI Coach of the Year: Bill Hodges, Indiana State
 Sporting News Coach of the Year: Bill Hodges, Indiana State

Other major awards 

 Frances Pomeroy Naismith Award (Best player under 6'0): Alton Byrd, Columbia
 Robert V. Geasey Trophy (Top player in Philadelphia Big 5): Tony Price, Penn & Rick Reed, Temple
 NIT/Haggerty Award (Top player in New York City metro area): Nick Galis, Seton Hall

Coaching changes 
A number of teams changed coaches during the season and after it ended.

References 

 Statistical Leaders and Coaching Changes from 1980 NCAA Basketball 84th Annual Guide, (Copyright 1979, NCAA)